The rhombic drive is a specific method of transferring mechanical energy, or work, used when a single cylinder is used for two separately oscillating pistons.

History
It was originally developed around 1900 for the twin-cylinder Lanchester car engine where it allowed perfect balancing of the inertial forces on both pistons.  A current example of its use is on beta type-Stirling engines; the drive's complexity and tight tolerances, causing a high cost of manufacture, is a hurdle for the widespread usage of this drive.

Operation

In its simplest form, the drive utilizes a jointed rhomboid to convert linear work from a reciprocating piston to rotational work.   The connecting rod of the piston is rigid as opposed to a common reciprocating engine which directly connects the piston to the crankshaft with a flexible joint in the piston. Instead, the rod connects to one corner of a rhombus.   When force is applied to the piston, it pushes down; at the same time, the outer corners of the rhomboid push out. They push on two cranks/flywheels which cause them to rotate, each in opposite directions. As the wheels rotate the rhombus progresses its change of shape from being flattened in the direction of the piston axis at top dead centre to being flattened in the perpendicular direction to the piston axis at bottom dead centre.

In the pictured example the left crank/flywheel turns clockwise and the right crank/flywheel anticlockwise.  They turn at the same angular velocity and this can be reinforced by intermeshing them as gear wheels.

References
 Mechanical Drives for Stirling Engines Dr. Siegfried "Zig" Herzog, Assistant Professor of Mechanical Engineering, Penn State University at Mont Alto. 06/01/05  Accessed August 2007

See also

Piston engines
Engine technology
Linkages (mechanical)